Steve Condos (October 12, 1918 in Pittsburgh, PASeptember 16, 1990 in Lyon) was an American tap dancer. He was a member of the Condos Brothers, with siblings Nick and Frank.

The Condos Brothers are credited in the film Wake Up and Live (1937), in which two of the brothers are introduced by orchestra leader Ben Bernie and dance two tap routines, but the brothers are not further identified.
They were also credited in the film Moon Over Miami (1941), as specialties.

He danced in the films Song of the Open Road (1944), Meet Me After the Show (1951), Tap (1989), and numerous others. He collaborated with Jimmy Slyde on a program of jazz tap improvisation at the Smithsonian Institution during the 1980s.

He died at 71 of a heart attack, in Lyon, France, in a dressing room of the Maurice Ravel auditorium shortly after performing at the Lyon International Dance Biennial.

References

External links
 Official Site

 "The Tap Fraternity Honors a Master,"  New York Times
 Biography of Steve Condos on Street Swing

American tap dancers
1918 births
1990 deaths
20th-century American dancers